Sheik Yerbouti is a double album by Frank Zappa, released in March 1979 as the first release on Zappa Records (distributed by Phonogram Inc.) It is mostly made up of live material recorded in 1977 and 1978, with extensive overdubs added in the studio. In an October 1978 interview, Zappa gave the working album title as Martian Love Secrets.  It was later released on a single CD. 

Sheik Yerbouti is Zappa's biggest selling album with over 2 million units sold worldwide.

Inspiration 
Zappa appears on the cover in character in Arab headdress. The title is a play on words and is pronounced like the 1976 disco hit "Shake Your Booty" by KC and the Sunshine Band.

The album has some of Zappa's most satirical and controversial lyrics. "Bobby Brown" was banned from US airplay due to its sexually explicit lyrics. "I Have Been in You" pokes fun at Peter Frampton's 1977 hit "I'm in You" while emphasizing an explicit meaning. "Dancin' Fool", a Grammy nominee, became a popular disco hit despite its obvious parodical reflection of disco music. "Flakes", about lazy union workers in California, includes a parody of Bob Dylan. "Jewish Princess", a humorous look at Jewish stereotyping, attracted attention from the Anti-Defamation League, to which Zappa denied an apology, arguing: "Unlike the unicorn, such creatures do exist—and deserve to be 'commemorated' with their own special opus".

"Rat Tomago" was edited from a live performance of "The Torture Never Stops", which originally appeared on Zoot Allures (1976); likewise, "The Sheik Yerbouti Tango" is taken from a live version of "Little House I Used to Live in", originally recorded for Burnt Weeny Sandwich in 1970. 

Some of the songs also appeared in Baby Snakes, Zappa's 1979 concert film. A clip of "City of Tiny Lites" with clay animation by Bruce Bickford was shown on the Old Grey Whistle Test.

Writing and recording 
Some songs, such as "Rat Tomago", are linked by brief pieces of musique concrète, and studio dialog from Zappa band members, Terry Bozzio and Patrick O'Hearn. In making "Rubber Shirt", Zappa combined a track of Terry playing drums in one musical setting with one of Patrick playing the bass in another.  The original performances differed in time signature and in tempo. Zappa described this technique as xenochrony. 

The album was engineered by Joe Chiccarelli. He later explained: "[Zappa's] engineer couldn’t make the session and so he decided to take a chance on me. I’m so thankful ever since that day because he gave me a career."

Reception 

Initially, the album was met with mixed reviews, due to the lyrical content. Despite this, the album remains a cult favorite among Zappa fans to this day.  The song "Bobby Brown" was extremely popular in Scandinavia. Zappa was reportedly so astounded by its success that he wanted CBS to hire an anthropologist to study why the song became such a big hit.

Reviewing in Christgau's Record Guide: Rock Albums of the Seventies (1981), Robert Christgau wrote: "If this be social 'satire,' how come its sole targets are ordinary citizens whose weirdnesses happen to diverge from those of the retentive gent at the control board? Or are we to read his new fixation on buggery as an indication of approval? Makes you wonder whether his primo guitar solo on 'Yo' Mama' and those as-unique-as-they-used-to-be rhythms and textures are as arid spiritually as he is. As if there were any question after all these years."

Track listing 
All songs composed, written and arranged by Frank Zappa except where noted. Dates & venues infos from Information Is Not Knowledge

Personnel

Musicians 
 Frank Zappa – lead guitar, lead (1-3, 9, 12, 15–18) and backing vocals, arranger, composer, producer, remixing
 Davey Moire – lead (6, 8) and backing vocals, engineer
 Napoleon Murphy Brock – lead (17) and backing vocals
 Andre Lewis – backing vocals
 Randy Thornton – lead (17) and backing vocals
 Adrian Belew – rhythm guitar, lead (5, 14) and backing vocals, Bob Dylan impersonation (2)
 Tommy Mars – keyboards, backing and lead (17) vocals
 Peter Wolf – keyboards, butter, Flora margarine
 Patrick O'Hearn – bass, lead (3, 6, 8) and backing vocals
 Terry Bozzio – drums, lead (3, 4, 6, 8, 13, 17) and backing vocals
 Ed Mann – percussion, backing vocals
 David Ocker – clarinet (17)

Production staff 
 Bob Stone – digital remastering
 Joe Chiccarelli – remixing, overdub engineer
 Lynn Goldsmith – photography, cover photo
 Peter Henderson – engineer
 Jon Walls – engineer
 Bob Ludwig – mastering engineer
 Kerry McNabb – engineer
 John Williams – art direction
 Gail Zappa – photography
 Amy Bernstein – artwork, layout design
 Barbara Isaak – assistant

Charts

Weekly charts

Year-end charts

Certifications and sales

References 

1979 live albums
Albums produced by Frank Zappa
Columbia Records albums
Frank Zappa live albums
Albums recorded at the Hammersmith Apollo